Rahma El Siddig Gasm Elbari Mustafa, more commonly known as Rahma El Siddig Mustafa or Rahma  Mustafa, is a Sudanese disability rights activist.

She is best known for objecting to being charged an extra boarding fee by Cambodian airline Bassaka Air because she is a wheelchair user.

Personal life 
In September 2015, Mustafa made the news after she was charged US$240 extra to board a Bassaka Air flight from Siem Reap to Phnom Penh because she uses a wheelchair and needed assistant board the aircraft. The initial news reporting led to accusations of blame being traded between the airline and the Cambodia Airport Management Service Company.

The charge led to an investigation by the Cambodian Disability Action Council to assess if there was a breach of Cambodian legislation.

Career 
In 2016, Mustafa was a program manager for ADD International (formally: Action on Disability and Development). She was a panelist at the UK Department for International Development's panel discussion and networking event on the 17 November 2016.

In 2018, she was awarded a fellowship from the International Disability Alliance Switzerland to study disability rights at the Centre for Disability Law and Policy, part of the National University of Ireland.

In 2019, she represented the Sudan National Union of Persons with Physical Disability, at a conference on the Convention on the Rights of Persons with Disabilities and the Sustainable Development Goals.

In 2020, Mustafa was a panelist at the United Nations Economic and Social Council event Inclusive Humanitarian Action = Effective Humanitarian Action.

Selected publications 

 Mustafa, R & Ouertani, I, October 2021, Tigray Refugees with Disabilities in Eastern Sudan Camps, Islamic Relief

References

External links 

 ADD International, official website

Living people
Disability rights activists
Sudanese women activists
Women activists
Year of birth missing (living people)